Melinda Lopez is an actress, playwright, and educator from Boston, Massachusetts. She is the first ever playwright-in-residence for the Huntington Theatre Company. She is a professor at Northeastern University.

Career 
As a playwright, Lopez has produced a sizable body of work that spans the last two decades and has garnered a variety of awards. Lopez's plays include Alexandros (Laguna Playhouse), Caroline in Jersey (Williamstown Theatre Festival), and Sonia Flew, which premiered at the Huntington Theatre in Boston, MA in 2004 and won several Best New Play awards. The Huntington's production of Sonia Flew was the inaugural production at the Huntington's space for new work, the Calderwood Pavilion at the Boston Center for the Arts. Sonia Flew has since been produced for radio broadcast and in multiple other cities. Lopez has also authored God Smells Like a Roast Pig (Women on Top Festival), The Order of Things (CentaStage), How do you Spell Hope? (Underground Railway Theatre), and a translation of Federico García Lorca's Blood Wedding for Suffolk University. In 2009, she was commissioned by the National Institute of Health to author a work celebrating the bicentennial of  Charles Darwin's birth, leading to her play From Orchids to Octopi, An Evolutionary Love Story. In 2013, Lopez was made the first ever playwright in residence at the Huntington Theatre thanks to a three-year grant from the Andrew W. Mellon Foundation. Lopez has held residencies with Harvard University, the New York Theatre Workshop, Sundance, and The Lark. Lopez has also acted in regional theaters across the country, most recently with Huntington Theatre Company and Speakeasy Stage Company of Boston.

Lopez's works frequently focus on the stories of Cuban or Cuban-American characters. Her play Becoming Cuba is set in 1897 Havana on the eve of the Spanish–American War, Alexandros centers on a Cuban family in exile, Sonia Flew is about a woman who was sent to the United States from Cuba as a child in 1961, and her one-woman show Midnight Sandwich/Medianoche (previously titled God Smells Like a Roast Pig) deals explicitly with Lopez's own struggle with her Cuban heritage.

In November 2016, ArtsEmerson produced Lopez's work, Mala. Mala is Lopez's one woman show about "an utterly unsentimental journey towards the end of life, Mala is an irreverent exploration of how we live, cope and survive in the moment." The production was directed by David Dower, and was remounted at the Calderwood Pavilion in January 2018 by the Huntington Theatre Company. The Huntington presentation was recorded and broadcast by GBH Channel 2 in 2020.

Personal life 
Lopez lives with her husband and daughter in Boston,. She has been a member of Actor's Equity Association since 1990. She holds a Bachelor of Arts from Dartmouth College and a Master of Arts from Boston University. She is Cuban American, and works with Boston-area charities that give humanitarian aid to Cuba. She is also a long-distance runner and has completed two marathons.

Selected works 
 The Lesson, Boston Theatre Marathon, 1999
 Midnight Sandwich/Medianoche; Or, God Smells Like a Roast Pig, The Women on Top Theatre Festival, 1999
 What The Market Will Bear, Boston Theatre Marathon, 2000
 Scenes from a Bordello, Boston Playwrights' Theater, 2000
 The Order of Things, CentaStage, 2000
 How Do You Spell Hope?, Underground Railway Theatre, 2001
 The Two Fifteen Local, Boston Theatre Marathon, 2002
 Sonia Flew, Huntington Theatre Company, 2004
 Gary, Steppenwolf Theatre Company First Look New Play Festival, 2007
 Alexandros, Laguna Playhouse, 2008
 Caroline in Jersey, Williamstown Theatre Festival, 2009
 From Orchids to Octopi: An Evolutionary Love Story, Underground Railway Theatre, 2009
 Blood Wedding translation, Suffolk University, 2009
 Bad Santa, Boston Theatre Marathon, 2010
 Downward Facing Dog, Boston Theatre Marathon, 2011
 Becoming Cuba, Huntington Theatre Company, 2014
 Girl Meets Boy: A Comedy About the Universe, Boston Museum of Science, Ongoing
 Back the Night, Boston Playwrights' Theatre, 2016
 Mala, ArtsEmerson, 2016
 Mr. Parent, Lyric Stage Company of Boston, 2022

Acting

Awards

See also
 Cuban American literature
 List of Cuban-American writers

References

External links

 Official website

Living people
American actresses
American dramatists and playwrights
Year of birth missing (living people)
Hispanic and Latino American dramatists and playwrights